Salvatore Pelosi (S 522) is a of the Italian Navy.

Construction and career
Salvatore Pelosi was laid down at Fincantieri Monfalcone Shipyard on 23 July 1985 and launched on 29 November 1986. She was commissioned on 14 July 1988.

She had been homeported in Taranto between 1999 and 2002 and was subjected to radical works that affected the platform and the combat system.

Gallery

Citations

External links
 

1986 ships
Sauro-class submarines
Ships built by Fincantieri